The men's road race at the 1967 UCI Road World Championships was the 34th edition of the event. The race took place on Sunday 3 September 1967 in Heerlen, the Netherlands. The race was won by Eddy Merckx of Belgium.

Final classification

Notes

References

Men's Road Race
UCI Road World Championships – Men's road race
1967 Super Prestige Pernod